The Born in the U.S.A. 12" Single Collection is a box set of 12" singles from the album Born in the U.S.A. by rock artist Bruce Springsteen. It was released in the UK in 1985 courtesy of CBS Records to help promote the Born in the U.S.A. album. It originally came with a poster of Springsteen and a bonus 7" single previously unreleased in the UK. It contains all the singles from Born in the U.S.A. except for "My Hometown" and "Born in the U.S.A." (However "Born in the U.S.A. the Freedom Mix" appeared as one of the b-sides to "I'm on Fire".) All songs written by Springsteen and mixed by Bob Clearmountain except where noted.

Track listings

Dancing in the Dark

Side A
 Dancing in the Dark (Extended Remix) 6:00
 Produced by Bruce Springsteen, Chuck Plotkin, Jon Landau, and Steven Van Zandt
 Recorded by Toby Scott

Side B
 Pink Cadillac 3:33
 Produced by Bruce Springsteen, Chuck Plotkin, Jon Landau, and Steven Van Zandt
 Recorded by Toby Scott

Cover Me

Side A
 Cover Me (Undercover Mix) 6:05
 Cover Me (Dub) 4:02
 Shut Out the Light 3:52

Cover Me Undercover Mix and Dub
 12" remix engineered by Toby Scott
 Produced by Bruce Springsteen, Chuck Plotkin, Jon Landau, and Steven Van Zandt
 Additional 12" remix producer - Arthur Baker
Remixed at The Hit Factory
 Recorded by Bill Scheniman

Shut Out the Light
 Produced by Bruce Springsteen, Chuck Plotkin, Jon Landau, and Steven Van Zandt

Side B
 Dancing in the Dark (Dub) 4:57
 Jersey Girl (Live 7/9/81) 5:50

Dancing in the Dark (Dub)
 Remix Engineer - Chris Lord-Alge
 Produced by Bruce Springsteen, Chuck Plotkin, Jon Landau, and Steven Van Zandt
 Additional remix producer - Arthur Baker

Jersey Girl (Live 7/9/81)
 Produced by Bruce Springsteen, Chuck Plotkin, Jon Landau, and Steven Van Zandt
 Written by Tom Waits
Recorded live at The Meadowlands July 9, 1981.

I'm on Fire

Side A
 I'm on Fire 2:36
 Rosalita (Come out Tonight) 7:02

I'm on Fire
 Produced by Bruce Springsteen, Chuck Plotkin, Jon Landau, and Steven Van Zandt
 Recorded by Toby Scott

Rosalita (Come out Tonight)
 Produced by Jim Cretecos and Mike Appel
Originally released on the album The Wild, The Innocent and the E Street Shuffle

Side B
 Born in the U.S.A. (The Freedom Mix) 7:20
 Johnny Bye Bye 1:20

Born in the U.S.A. (The Freedom Mix)
 12" remix engineer - Toby Scott
 Produced by Bruce Springsteen, Chuck Plotkin, Jon Landau, and Steven Van Zandt
 Additional 12" remix producer - Arthur Baker for Arthur Baker, Inc.

Johnny Bye Bye
 Produced by Bruce Springsteen, Chuck Plotkin, and Jon Landau
 Recorded by Toby Scott
 Written by Bruce Springsteen and Chuck Berry

Glory Days

Side A
 Glory Days 4:15
 Stand on It 2:30

Glory Days
 Produced by Bruce Springsteen, Chuck Plotkin, Jon Landau, and Steven Van Zandt
 Recorded by Toby Scott

Stand on It
 Produced by Bruce Springsteen, Chuck Plotkin, and Jon Landau
 Recorded and mixed by Toby Scott

Side B
 Sherry Darling 4:02
 Racing in the Street 6:52

Sherry Darling
Produced by Bruce Springsteen, Jon Landau, and Steven Van Zandt
Originally released on the album The River

Racing in the Street
Originally released on the album Darkness on the Edge of Town

Bonus 7" Single: I'm Goin' Down

Side A
 I'm Goin' Down 3:29
 Produced by Bruce Springsteen, Chuck Plotkin, Jon Landau, and Steven Van Zandt
 Recorded by Toby Scott

Side B
 Janey, Don't You Lose Heart 3:23
 Produced by Bruce Springsteen, Chuck Plotkin, and Jon Landau
 Recorded by Toby Scott

Review

The Born in the U.S.A. 12" Single Collection retrospectively received four and a half stars out of five from William Ruhlmann of Allmusic. He said that "The remixes were trendy at the time -- even Bob Dylan employed remixer Arthur Baker (who also served here) in the mid '80s -- though they now sound like curiosities. But the B-sides are nearly the equal of some of the released tracks on Born in the U.S.A., and the addition of songs like "Rosalita" make this box a comprehensive sampler of Springsteen's work up to 1985. The only problem is that you have to keep getting up and changing the records."

References

1985 compilation albums
Bruce Springsteen compilation albums
Albums produced by Chuck Plotkin
Albums produced by Steven Van Zandt
Albums produced by Jon Landau
B-side compilation albums
Columbia Records compilation albums